Ocean Star is an Australian children's television series that first screened on Network Ten on 10 February 2003 until 2003.

Plot summary
Trent and Dylan Steadman are city kids who are sent by their mother to live with their father in a small seaside town. They struggle to make friends with the local kids. Trent meets Swampy, an old pearl diver who tells him about a priceless cluster of pearls known as the 'Ocean Star' that he claims were lost when his boat sunk in a cyclone forty years ago. The quest for the treasure sends Trent and the kids on an exciting and dangerous adventure.

Cast List
 Jared Daperis as Trent Steadman
 Jason Smith as Dylan Steadman
 Graeme Blundell as Clive 'Swampy' Marsh
 Brooke Callaghan as Gemma Carruthers
 Rob Carlton as Reg Davies
 Sage Butler as Karla Davies
 Rohanna Angus as Bronwyn Michaels
 Kate Rice as Caitlin Carruthers
 Kai Kamada-Laws as Susi Fujiwara
 Mark Coles Smith as 'Spider' Webb
 Andrew Lewis as Grant Steadman
 Penny Arrow as Denise Bennett

See also
 List of Australian television series

External links
Ocean Star  at IMDb

Network 10 original programming
Australian children's television series
2003 Australian television series debuts
2003 Australian television series endings